Wallace Spearmon Jr. (born December 24, 1984, in Chicago, Illinois, USA) is a retired American sprint athlete, who specializes in the 200 meters. He is a two-time NCAA outdoor champion in the 200 m and won the silver medal in the event at the 2005 World Championships in Athletics. He has a personal best of 19.65 seconds for the distance, making him the ninth fastest 200 meter runner of all time, and he formerly held the indoor American record.

He has won the bronze medal twice at the World Championships in Athletics in 2007 and 2009. He also finished third at the 2008 Summer Olympics, but was later disqualified for stepping out of his lane.

Career
Spearmon is a graduate of Fayetteville High School and attended the University of Arkansas, where he competed collegiately for two seasons before turning pro. While at Arkansas, he won the 200 meters NCAA Outdoor title in 2004 and 2005 as well as the NCAA Indoor 200 m title in 2005. In August 2005, he won the silver medal in the 200 m at the 2005 World Championships and in August 2007, he won the bronze medal at the 2007 World Championships. Spearmon won the 200 m at the USA outdoor athletics championships in 2006 and finished second in 2007. At the 2009 World Championships in Berlin he won another bronze. He ran a world best time of 31.88 for the 300 m indoors in February 2006.

His personal best in the 200 m is 19.65 seconds. This time (achieved in Daegu, Korea) made him the third fastest man over the distance at that point. He is currently ranked as the twelfth fastest 200-meter runner ever. Only world record holder Usain Bolt (19.19), Yohan Blake (19.26), Noah Lyles (19.31), Michael Johnson (19.32), Erriyon Knighton (19.49), Walter Dix (19.53), Justin Gatlin (19.57), his training partner Tyson Gay (19.58), Andre de Grasse (19.62), Xavier Carter (19.63), and Reynier Mena (19.63) have run faster. Despite the fact that he normally runs a "slower" first half of his 200 m races and goes on to pass people down the stretch, his 100 meters personal best is 9.96 s. He set that mark running in Shanghai on September 28, 2007, beating 100 m world champion Tyson Gay.

Spearmon initially finished in the bronze medal position in the 200 m in the 2008 Summer Olympics in Beijing, but was disqualified for stepping out of his lane. The second-place finisher, Churandy Martina of the Netherlands Antilles, was also disqualified, giving Americans Shawn Crawford and Walter Dix the silver and bronze medals, respectively.

He posted a quick time of 19.98 seconds in the 200 m in Kingston, Jamaica in April 2010, finishing behind Usain Bolt. He reached the 2010 IAAF Diamond League 200 m final at the Weltklasse Zurich meeting, and (in the absence of points leader Walter Dix) he won the first Diamond Race Trophy with a meeting record of 19.79 seconds. Following the Diamond League win, he ran 19.85 seconds to win at the Rieti IAAF Grand Prix.

At the start of the 2012 season, he broke Michael Johnson's 200 m meet record at the Drake Relays with a run of 20.02 seconds. He finished fourth in the 200 metres final at the 2012 London Olympics. His time of 19.90 seconds was 6/100 of a second outside of a medal placing.

Spearmon finished 21st at the 2013 World Championships, running a time of 20.66 seconds in the semi-final .

At a meeting in Edmonton in July, 2014, Spearmon tested positive for methylprednisolone contained in a medicine he was taking without asking for an exemption. USADA accepted the excuse so it was treated as a minor violation.  On September 19, 2014, it was announced he would receive a 3-month suspension, backdated to August 27.

Spearmon attended the 2015 World Championships, but did not start his heat.

Personal life
Spearmon's father, Wallace Spearmon Sr., was also a sprinter. He was the 1987 bronze medalist in the 200 meters at the Pan American Games.

He is good friends with fellow sprinter Usain Bolt; they are known for their jokes and good friendship.

On an April 2011 episode of MythBusters, he worked with Adam Savage and Jamie Hyneman to investigate the possibility of a human running on water. In May 2013 he returned to the show to race 30 ft against a race car.

Personal bests

 All information taken from IAAF profile.

References

External links

 
 
 Flotrack Interviews of Wallace Spearmon (video)
 USATF Athlete of the week: January 2005, July 2005, February 2006, October 2006

1984 births
Living people
American male sprinters
American sportspeople in doping cases
Doping cases in athletics
African-American male track and field athletes
Sportspeople from Fayetteville, Arkansas
Track and field athletes from Arkansas
Fayetteville High School (Arkansas) alumni
Arkansas Razorbacks men's track and field athletes
Athletes (track and field) at the 2008 Summer Olympics
Athletes (track and field) at the 2012 Summer Olympics
Olympic track and field athletes of the United States
World Athletics Championships medalists
Athletes (track and field) at the 2015 Pan American Games
World Athletics Championships athletes for the United States
Pan American Games gold medalists for the United States
Pan American Games medalists in athletics (track and field)
Diamond League winners
USA Outdoor Track and Field Championships winners
World Athletics Indoor Championships winners
IAAF Continental Cup winners
Medalists at the 2015 Pan American Games
21st-century African-American sportspeople
20th-century African-American people